USS Tonawanda is a name used more than once by the United States Navy:

 , a monitor operating during the American Civil War.
 , a World War II net laying ship.

References 

United States Navy ship names